Lircay District is one of twelve districts of the Angaraes Province in Peru.

Geography 
Other mountains are listed below:

Ethnic groups 
The people in the district are mainly Indigenous citizens of Quechua descent. Quechua is the language which the majority of the population (70.32%) learnt to speak in childhood, 29.48% of the residents started speaking using the Spanish language (2007 Peru Census).

References